Aequorivita vladivostokensis is a Gram-negative, strictly aerobic, non-spore-forming, heterotrophic and non-motile bacterium from the genus of Aequorivita which has been isolated from the Troitsa Bay from the Sea of Japan.

References

External links
Type strain of Aequorivita vladivostokensis at BacDive -  the Bacterial Diversity Metadatabase

Flavobacteria
Bacteria described in 2003